Don't Hold Back may refer to:

 Don't Hold Back, a 2001 album by Public Announcement
 Don't Hold Back, a 1970 album by Sky
 "Don't Hold Back" (The Potbelleez song), 2007
 "Don't Hold Back", a song by The Alan Parsons Parsons Project from Eve
 "Don't Hold Back", a song by The Sleeping from Questions & Answers
 "Don't Hold Back", a song by Chanson